The 1908 News of the World Match Play was the sixth News of the World Match Play tournament. It was played from Tuesday 6 to Thursday 8 October at Mid-Surrey Golf Club. 32 players competed in a straight knock-out competition, with each match contested over 18 holes, except for the final which was over 36 holes. The winner received £100 out of a total prize fund of £240. J.H. Taylor defeated Fred Robson by 2 holes in the final to win the tournament.

Qualification
Entry was restricted to members of the Professional Golfers' Association (PGA). Qualification was by a series of 36-hole stroke-play competitions; one for each of the six PGA sections. The Southern section had 14 qualifiers, the Northern section 7, the Midland and the Scottish sections 4, the Irish section 2 and the Welsh section 1. Compared to 1907 there was one extra qualifier for the Northern section and one less for Welsh section. In the event of a tie for places there was a playoff.

The qualifiers were:

 Irish section: James Edmundson, Harry Kidd
 Midland section: Willie Aveston, George Coburn, Jack Oke, Tom Williamson
 Northern section: Tom Ball, Tom Beck, Sandy Herd, Ted Ray, Thomas Renouf, Fred Robson, Tom Watt
 Southern section: James Batley, James Bradbeer, James Braid, Ernest Gray, Rowland Jones, Arnaud Massy, Charles Mayo, Jack Rowe, James Sherlock, J.H. Taylor, Albert Tingey, Sr., Harry Vardon, Tom Vardon, Reg Wilson
 Scottish section: Willie Binnie, Willie Fernie, Charles Neaves, Ben Sayers
 Welsh section: Syd Ball

Format
The format was unchanged. Matches were over 18 holes except for the final which was over 36 holes. Extra holes were played in the event of a tied match. Two rounds were played on the first day, two more on the second day with the final on the third day.

Results
Source:

w/o = Walkover

Prize money
The winner received £100 and a gold medal, the runner-up £30 and a silver medal, the losing semi-finalists £15 and a bronze medal, while the third round losers received £10 and the second round losers received £5.

References

Golf tournaments in England
News of the World Match Play
News of the World Match Play
October 1908 sports events